"Frinkcoin" is the 13th episode of the thirty-first season of the American animated television series The Simpsons, and the 675th episode overall. It aired in the United States on Fox on February 23, 2020. The episode was written by Rob LaZebnik and was directed by Steven Dean Moore.

Plot
The Simpson family are eating at The Lentil Institution, a vegan restaurant, vying for Lisa to choose them for her "Most interesting person I know" paper, but she chooses Professor Frink, devoted to helping the world through science. At Springfield University, Lisa visits and interviews him. After explaining the story of his life, Frink says he is developing a new cryptocurrency, Frinkcoin.

Frinkcoin becomes famous and Frink becomes the richest man in town, enraging Mr. Burns. Satoshi Nakamoto makes guest appearance behind Bear Wall.  Frink however feels empty inside, so Lisa tries to help him. He moves from his university office to Chicago, but still feels sad. Marge suggests Homer takes him to Moe's Tavern. Frink aces Moe's trivia questions and earns the respect and friendship of the barflies. He begins taking them to Springfield's finest establishments.

Smithers assembles a team to create Burns Coin and develop a formula to devaluate Frinkcoin, but the calculations would take thousands of years. Burns decides to break Frink's spirit instead, showing Frink that his new friends only like him for his money. Burns brings the equation in the center of town for an instant crowdsourcing solution. Meanwhile, Frink tests the sincerity of his friends; all of them fail.

A solution to the equation gets posted on the whiteboard; Lisa realizes that it was posted by Frink himself, losing all his money in the process, and they become best friends. In the end, he returns to the university and kisses the professor whose office he shares.

Reception
Dennis Perkins of The A.V. Club gave this episode a B, stating that the episode "uses the cryptocurrency concept as an excuse for a largely successful exercise in side-character development."

Den of Geek gave this episode 4 out of 5 stars.

On July 28, 2020, this episode was nominated for an Emmy for outstanding voiceover performance by Hank Azaria.

References

External links 
 

The Simpsons (season 31) episodes
2020 American television episodes
Cryptocurrencies in fiction
Fictional currencies